London City Council is the governing body of the city of London, Ontario, Canada.

Composition
London is divided into 14 wards, with residents in each ward electing one councillor. The mayor is elected citywide, who along with the councillors forms a 15-member council.

2017 reform
In spite of some controversy about this move, London was the first city in Canada (in May 2017) to decide to move a ranked choice ballot for municipal elections starting in 2018. Voters will mark their ballots in order of preference, ranking their top three favourite candidates. An individual must reach 50 per cent of the total to be declared elected; in each round of counting where a candidate has not yet reached that target, the person with the fewest votes is dropped from the ballot and their second or third choice preferences reallocated to the remaining candidates, with this process repeating until a candidate has reached 50 per cent. On November 20, 2020, the Ontario Legislature passed Bill 218, the Supporting Ontario's Recovery and Municipal Elections Act, which included an amendment to the 1996 Municipal Elections Act to ban ranked balloting from being used in Ontario municipalities. This move was symbolically opposed in October by a 14-1 vote by City Council.

2010 reform
Prior to the 2006 civic election, London's city council consisted of 14 councillors (two from each of the seven former wards), four members of Board of Control (elected citywide), and one mayor (elected citywide), to form a 19-member council.

The composition and structure of city council was the subject of two questions on the 2003 election ballot, an action initiated by Ward 3 Councillor Fred Tranquilli and his discussion paper, A Better Way, which proposed a smaller city council with 10 wards (one councillor per ward), plus the mayor elected citywide and the elimination of Board of Control for an 11-member city council.

While the yes votes prevailed, the overall voter turnout was less than 50 per cent and according to the provisions of the Municipal Act, the referendum results were not binding.

When council decided to maintain the status quo, a grassroots citizens' activism group, Imagine London, appealed to the Ontario Municipal Board (OMB) to change the ward composition to 14 wards defined by communities of interest in the city, including a separate ward for the downtown core.

UWO law librarian and media professor Sam Trosow argued the case at the OMB for Imagine London arguing that smaller wards based on communities of interest would result in more "effective representation" for the electorate. This argument is based on a 1991 Supreme Court of Canada decision involving electoral boundaries in the Province of Saskatchewan (often cited as the "Carter" case).

The OMB ruled for the Imagine London petitioners in late December 2005 and while the city sought leave to appeal the OMB decision to Superior Court via a full-day hearing in January 2006, leave to appeal was denied when Justice McDermid released his decision on February 28, 2006.

In the 2006 municipal election, a number of candidates included in their platforms the abolition of Board of Control. Among them was Gina Barber, a member of Imagine London, who gained a seat on the board of control, coming in second only to the deputy mayor, Tom Gosnell.

Following the election, a task force composed of a number of councillors, controllers, and citizen representatives was established to make recommendations on governance. The task force held numerous meetings and public hearings. On the basis of its deliberations, it recommended that the board of control be abolished and its functions assumed by a combination of standing committees, delegation to staff and citizen groups and Committee of the Whole. The recommendations were placed before a public participation meeting and subsequently adopted by council in a vote of 14 to 5. Consequently, positions for Board of Control were not on the 2010 municipal ballot.

1994-1997
Council elected in the 1994 municipal election.

1997-2000
Council elected in the 1997 municipal election.

2000-2003
Council elected in the 2000 municipal election.

2003-2006
Council elected in the 2003 municipal election.

2006-2010
Council elected in the 2006 municipal election.

2010-2014
Council elected in the 2010 municipal election.

2014-2018
Council elected in the 2014 municipal election.

2018-2022
Council elected in the 2018 municipal election.

2022-2026
Council elected in the 2022 municipal election.

City Halls

 1928–1971: a four-storey building at the corner of Dundas Street and Wellington added to the Public Utilities Commission Building c. 1918; it is now a commercial building at 272-274 Dundas Street
 1971–present: located at 300 Dufferin Avenue, a 12-storey Modernist office block built by local architect Philip Carter Johnson

See also
List of mayors of London, Ontario

References

External links
Official website

Municipal councils in Ontario
Municipal government of London, Ontario